Bruno José de Souza, commonly known as Bruno José, is a Brazilian football player who plays as a forward for Guarani, on loan from Cruzeiro

Career
Trained in the youth ranks of Internacional, Bruno José turned professional at the start of 2019 and, after making two appearances for the senior team in Campeonato Gaúcho, was loaned to Botafogo-SP at the end of February 2019 for the rest of the year. He made his national league debut in the first match of 2019 Campeonato Brasileiro Série B on 27 April 2019, a 3–1 victory against Vitória.

References

External links
 

Living people
1998 births
Brazilian footballers
Association football forwards
Campeonato Brasileiro Série B players
Sport Club Internacional players
Botafogo Futebol Clube (SP) players
Centro Sportivo Alagoano players
Grêmio Esportivo Brasil players
Cruzeiro Esporte Clube players
Guarani FC players